Marcos Antonio Humberto Ferraez IV (born ) is an American actor best known for his work on the mid-1990s television drama, Pacific Blue.

He played Ground Rush in the 2000 movie Cutaway. He also appeared on the television series The Shield (2003, 2004) and Sons of Anarchy (2008, 2010).

Personal life 
Ferraez was born in the United States, and grew up in Mexico, before returning to the United States.

Ferraez married Israeli actress Alona Tal on March 23, 2005. The couple has two daughters, born in March 2017 and September 2022.

Filmography

Notes

References

External links

American male film actors
American male television actors
1966 births
Living people
Place of birth missing (living people)